Pazhou Bridge is a bridge in Guangzhou, Guangdong, China. The bridge connects Tianhe District across the Zhujiang River to the southern district of Huangpuchong in Guangzhou.

Bridges in Guangzhou
Bridges over the Pearl River (China)